Charles Franklin Niles (1888-1916) was an early aviator having been taught by Glenn Curtiss in 1913. It was stated in his obituary that he was the first to fly around the Statue of Liberty, and that he served as an aviator in the 1910–1920 Mexican Revolution. On June 25, 1916, while flying a loop maneuver in his Moisant monoplane at the Oshkosh, Wisconsin fairgrounds a wing collapsed and he crashed. He died of his injuries the next day. A witness to the crash was cartoonist Robert Osborn.

References

1888 births
1916 deaths
Aviators from New York (state)
Aviators killed in aviation accidents or incidents in the United States
Accidental deaths in Wisconsin
Members of the Early Birds of Aviation
Victims of aviation accidents or incidents in 1916